The golden-crowned flycatcher (Myiodynastes chrysocephalus) is a species of bird in the family Tyrannidae.

It is found in Argentina, Bolivia, Colombia, Ecuador, Mexico, Panama, Peru, and Venezuela. Its natural habitats are subtropical or tropical moist montane forests and heavily degraded former forest.

References

golden-crowned flycatcher
Birds of the Andes
golden-crowned flycatcher
Taxonomy articles created by Polbot